Benjamin Farrington (10 July 1891 –1974) was an Irish scholar and professor of Classics, teaching in Ireland (1916–1920), South Africa (1920–1935), and Great Britain (1935–1956). Although his academic career spanned several disciplines, he is most well known for his contributions to the history of Greek science. Moreover, within the development of the discipline, his books were some of the first written in the English language that focused specifically on Greek science. In addition to his professional academic career he was also active in socialist politics, using his intellectual capabilities to speak and write on it.  While beginning his academic career in South Africa in 1920 he became heavily involved in the Irish Republican Association of South Africa. In the process he wrote several articles for local South African newspapers about the need for Ireland to separate from England. In addition, he was instrumental in forming the Irish Peace Conference in Paris in 1922. Such political commitments inevitably influenced his teaching style, giving him the reputation in South Africa of being an intellectual Marxist. However, from the perspective of some critics, his Marxist commitments overshadowed his scholarly work, heavily tainting them. One of his better known pamphlets on socialism, written in 1940, is The Challenge of Socialism.

Early life
Farrington was born in Cork City, Ireland into an Anglo-Irish family.  His father was the city engineer and was a Congregationalist, a Protestant church in the Calvinist tradition.

Political activism
Farrington arrived in South Africa in March 1920 to serve as a lecturer at the University of Cape Town. By September, Farrington was writing articles for Die Burger (The Citizen) in which he tried to persuade the paper's Afrikaan readership to support Sinn Féin and the Irish in the Irish War of Independence. Keeping in mind the readership was also overwhelming Protestant, Farrington sought to frame the conflict as a cultural and political one, not one based on a religious divide as some might. Farrington's partisan articles for Die Burger annoyed his employers at the University of Cape Town, who issued him a formal warning, which Farrington abided by. Nonetheless, at the same Farrington formed the Irish Republican Association of South Africa (IRASA), which launched its own newspaper The Republic in November 1920. Farrington served as the editor of the paper which ran from November 1920 to June 1922 over the course of 41 editions. The front of the first edition of the paper featured a portrait of Terence McSwiney, the Lord Mayor of Cork who had just recently died on a hunger strike.  

In November 1921, Farrington was elected by the IRASA to be the organisation's delegate to the Irish Race Conference in Paris to be held in January of 1922. Many, including Eamon De Valera, credited the South African Irish and Farrington with the idea of holding another Irish Race Convention, as Farrington had been pushing the idea of an "Irish World Organisation" since early 1921, an association of members of the Irish Diaspora which would have a greater influence in the building of the new Irish Republic. However, what was posed to be a great feather in Farrington's cap ended in disaster as the convention was racked with in-fighting between those for and against the newly signed Anglo-Irish Treaty. Another issue was that during the convention, delegates from Ireland pushed for the idea that the "Irish World Organisation" should be controlled by a committee in Ireland that would dictate policy to the Irish abroad. Farrington himself hated this idea and, in order to prevent it, opposed his own Irish World Organisation idea.>   

Following the convention, a dejected Farrington returned to South Africa where in The Republic he broke the IRASA's own policy of neutrality on the issue of the Anglo-Irish treaty to attack De Valera and his cult of personality. Farrington also conceded that violence would be inevitable, foreshadowing the breakout of the Irish Civil War. The bitter divisions caused by the Civil war seemed to cause the IRASA to break apart, and the Republic did not publish any more editions after June 1922. Simultaneously, events back in South Africa were also weighing down on Farrington; the Rand Rebellion broke out in March and pushed Farrington away from entertaining Afrikaan nationalism. Farrington was disappointed to see the Rand Rebellion, which had started as a workers' strike, became subsumed by segregationists.  

Instead of actively campaigning, Farrington withdrew and became to study the work of Irish Syndicalist James Connolly, of whom he became an admirer. In 1921 South African Communist Party was formed, but despite Farrington's newfound interest in Connolly he declined to join. Instead, he would gravitate towards Trotskyist groups already setting up as well in South Africa.       

In  1936 Farrington (and his wife Ruth) joined the Communist Party of Great Britain following their immigration to the UK. Following the Hungarian Revolution of 1956 Farrington left the Communist party, dismayed by the Soviet counter-invasion.

Academic career
Benjamin Farrington received a Classics degree from University College Cork, Ireland, and then a degree in Middle English from Trinity College Dublin, Ireland. From 1915 to 1917 he pursued a master's degree in English from University College, completing his thesis in 1917 on Percy Bysshe Shelley's translations from Greek. While finishing his thesis he also served as an assistant professor in Classics at Queen's University in Belfast from 1916–1920. In 1920 he moved to South Africa to teach at the University of Cape Town, serving as Lecturer in Greek (1920–1922), Senior Lecturer in Classics (1922–1930), and Professor of Latin (1930–1935). In 1935 he moved to England to become Lecturer in Classics at the University of Bristol (1935–1936), and then Professor of Classics at University College, Swansea (1936–1956), where he taught until his retirement.

Critical reception

Personal life
Not long after settling in Cape Town in South Africa, Farrington began to attend the salon of Ruth Schechter, a member of the intelligentsia in her own right but also notable as the daughter of Solomon Schechter, the American Rabbi, and the wife of politician and lawyer Morris Alexander. Over the years Farrington and Schechter became quite close. Schechter left her husband and South Africa in 1933 and married Farrington in August 1935 in the United Kingdom. Ruth died in March 1942.

References

Bibliography
Science in Antiquity (1936, reprinted in 1969).
The Civilisation of Greece and Rome (1938, Victor Gollancz).
Science and Politics in the Ancient World (1939, 1946).
Greek Science: Its Meaning for Us; Part I (1944, reprinted with Part II in 1953, paperback 2000 ).
Head and Hand in Ancient Greece: Four Studies in the Social Relations of Thought (1947, paperback 2001 ).
Greek Science: Its Meaning for Us; Part II (1949, reprinted with Part I in 1953, paperback 1981 , 2000 ).
Francis Bacon, Philosopher of Industrial Science (1951, 1973 , reprint 1979 ).
Francis Bacon, Pioneer of Planned Science (1963, 1969 )
The Philosophy of Francis Bacon (1964 , paperback 1966 ).
Lucretius, editor (1965).
What Darwin Really Said (1966 , paperback 1996 ).
The Faith of Epicurus (1967).
The Philosophy of Francis Bacon: An essay on its development from 1603 to 1609, with new translations of fundamental texts (1970).
Samuel Butler and the Odyssey (1974 ).

References
Communist Party of Ireland, "Some Famous Irish Communists: Benjamin Farrington (1891–1974)", Communist Party of Ireland, (accessed 18 June 2006).
Needham, Joseph, "Preface" in Farrington, Benjamin, Greek Science: Its Meaning for Us. Nottingham, Spokesman (Russell House), 2000.

External links
 

1891 births
1974 deaths
Alumni of Trinity College Dublin
Alumni of University College Cork
Historians of science
Irish communists
Irish republicans
Protestant Irish nationalists
South African classical scholars
South African communists
Academic staff of the University of Cape Town